Éric Sitruk (born 14 January 1978, in Bondy) is a French football striker who last played for Stade Brest 29.

Statistics 

Updated 2 May 2010

References

1978 births
Living people
French footballers
Stade Lavallois players
FC Rouen players
En Avant Guingamp players
Stade Brestois 29 players
Ligue 2 players
Entente SSG players
FC Versailles 78 players
Association football forwards